

Administrative and municipal divisions

References

Nenets Autonomous Okrug
Nenets Autonomous Okrug